Jürgen von Kamptz (August 11, 1891 – August 12, 1954) was a German military officer and a SS member. As SS Obergruppenführer (No. 1258905) and General of the SS Police during World War II; he served as commander of the Order Police in the Protectorate of Bohemia and Moravia, in Norway and in Italy.

Biography
Kamptz parents were the senior administrative court judge Bernhard Karl Wilhelm Florus von Kamptz (March 28, 1847 – April 11, 1916) and his wife Anna Luise Henriette Elten (July 9, 1856 – June 1, 1920). After school graduation Kamptz joined, on June 8, 1912, the 64th Infantry Regiment as an ensign and fought in World War I. In September 1918 he married Veronika, née Ayrer, with whom he´d have two daughters. He ended the war with a brevet promotion to first lieutenant. Afterwards he joined the Prussian police service. In August 1932 he joined the Nazi Party, (membership number 1,258,905). Kamptz worked in Department III of Prussian Ministry of the Interior from late September 1933 to mid-June 1936. In 1936 Kamptz worked as Inspector-General of the Gendarmerie and City Police in the Ordnungspolizei main office until April 1937. Starting in April 1937, to June 1939, Kamptz was commander of Berlin's Schutzpolizei. In March 1938, Kamptz became a member of the Schutzstaffel (SS No. 292,714) with the rank of SS Oberführer.

In June 1939 Kamptz became the commander of the Ordnungspolizei in the Protectorate of Bohemia and Moravia, working from Prague. From April 1941 to May 1943 he was back in the main office in Berlin as Inspector-General the Gendarmerie and the Municipal Schutzpolizei, succeeding Rudolf Querner. From June 1943 to September 1943 Kamptz was commanding the Ordnungspolizei of the Reichskommissariat Norway, based in Oslo.

In September 1943 Kamptz was transferred to Italy, in the same position,  working under Karl Wolff. There Kamptz was also responsible for Bandenbekämpfung, hunting and suppressing resistance fighters and political prisoners and organising the respective transfer to prisons and concentration camps. Working with Theodor Dannecker and Friedrich Boßhammer, Kamptz provided the security guards to deport the Jews from Italy. In August 1944, Kamptz was appointed SS Obergruppenführer and General of the Police. Kamptz was awarded the German Cross in silver on February 7, 1945. 
On April 29, 1945, Kamptz was taken prisoner of war by the Allies in Rimini. Kamptz was transferred to Island Farm Special Camp 11 in June 1947 and from there to the Neuengamme internment camp in October 1947.

Ranks
     SS-Obergruppenführer  General of politie: 1 August 1944 - 30 July 1944
    SS-Gruppenführer: 9 November 1940
    Generalleutnant of Polizei: 1 July 1940 (RDA 20 April 1939)
    Charakter als Generalleutnant of Polizei: 20 April 1939
    SS-Brigadeführer: 20 April 1939
    SS-Oberführer: 12 March 1938
    Generalmajor of Polizei: 17 June 1936
    Generalmajor of Gendarmerie: 1 April 1936
    Oberst der Gendarmerie: 9 August 1934
    Oberstleutnant of Polizei: 27 September 1933
    Major der Polizei: 23 December 1929
    Hauptmann of Polizei: 29 July 1923
    Oberleutnant of Polizei: 20 June 1921
    Leutnant of Polizei: 1 February 1920
    Charakter  Oberleutnant: 30/31 January 1920
    Leutnant: 17 February 1914
    Fähnrich: 27 January 1913
    Fahnenjunker: 6/8 June 1912

See also 
Register of SS leaders in general's rank
The Holocaust in Italy

References

1891 births
1954 deaths
Recipients of the German Cross
German prisoners of war in World War II held by the United States
SS-Obergruppenführer
German Army personnel of World War I
German people of World War II
SS and Police Leaders
Holocaust perpetrators in Italy